The East Coast Wrestling Association Women's Championship (stylized as ECWA Women's Championship) was a women's professional wrestling championship in East Coast Wrestling Association.

Title history

Combined Reigns

References

External links
 ECWA Women's Championship

East Coast Wrestling Association championships
Women's professional wrestling championships